Mountain worship (sangaku shinko) is a faith that regards mountains as sacred and objects of worship.

Description 
Mountain worship is a form of Nature worship that seems to have evolved from the reverence that ethnic groups closely associated with mountains have for mountainous terrain and the natural environment that accompanies it. In mountain worship, there is a belief in the spiritual power of mountainous areas and a form of using the overwhelming feeling of the mountains to govern one's life

These faiths are mainly found in the cultures of inland mountainous regions, where mountains with inhospitable, rugged terrain are essential for their development.

In areas with such beliefs, people depend on the River flowing from the mountains and the Forest spreading at the foot of the mountains for all their food, clothing, and shelter, and are constantly being blessed by the mountains they see. On the other hand, the people who hold these beliefs are in an environment where even the slightest carelessness in the rugged terrain and natural environment can lead to the loss of life. It is thought to be passed on as knowledge for one's own safety.

Cultural Areas with Mountain Beliefs 

 Korean people, Yanbian Korean people
 Chinese people
 Tibetan people
 Manchurian people
 Yamato people
 Vietnamese people
 Nepal
 Ladakh
 Peru

Mountain worship variously in Asia 
In Japanese Ko-Shintō, due to the blessings obtained from water sources, hunting grounds, mines, forests, and awe and reverence for the majestic appearance and volcanos, mountains and Mountains and mountains embracing forests are believed to be mountains where the god God resides or descends, and are sometimes called Iwakura or Iwasaka, the edge of the everlasting world (the land of the gods or divine realm) and The Iwakura rocks There is also the idea of Yamagami Taikai, in which the Soul (Ancestral Spirit) of the deceased returns to the mountains (others include Umi Taikai and Chikyu Taikai). These traditions also remain in Shinto shrines, and there are some cases where the mountain itself is worshipped, such as Mount Ishizuchi, Suwa-taisha, and Mount Miwa. In rural areas, there is a belief that Yama-no-Kami descends to the village in Spring to become Ta-no-Kami, and returns to the mountain after the autumn harvest, in relation to being a water source.

Also in Buddhism, a high mountain called Mount Meru is believed to rise at the center of the world, and Kukai founded Koya and Saicho founded Hiei Mount Hiei, the reverence for mountains grew even deeper. This is the reason why Buddhist temples even in the plains have Sangōji.

In Tibetan Buddhism, holy mountains are also objects of worship, but the faith is dedicated to the mountain itself, and climbing the mountain is often considered forbidden. In Japan, on the other hand, it is noteworthy that reaching the top of a mountain is considered important. Of course, the Japanese have faith in the mountain itself, but they also have a strong tendency to appreciate the God's Light that is worshipped early in the morning, probably because they have faith in what lies beyond the top of the mountain (the other world). In Japan, Sun worship as Animism is connected with mountain worship.

After that, Shugenjas and Yamabushis, who were descended from Esoteric Buddhism and Taoism, went deep into the mountains to practice asceticism in order to disconnect from the mundane world and achieve Enlightenment. This later gave rise to Shugendo and spell-like religions.

Main forms 
The main forms of mountain worship in Japan can be summarized as follows.

Belief in Volcanoes 
Fuji, Mt. Aso, Mt. Chokai, and other volcanoes are believed to have gods because of the fear of volcanic eruptions.

Belief in the mountain as a source of water 
Belief in mountains, such as Mt. Hakusan, which can be a source of water to enrich the surrounding area.

Belief in a mountain where the spirits of the dead are said to gather 
In Japan, there are many mountains such as Osorezan, Tsukiyama, Tateyama, Kumano Sanzan, etc. where the spirits of the dead are believed to go after death, and these mountains are sometimes the object of worship.

Belief in mountains where divine spirits are said to be 
In the Buzen Province, Mount Miwa is the inner shrine of Usa Jingū, Ōmiwa Shrine, and Mount Ōmine is said to have been founded by En no Gyōja.

Mount Sobo]], located on the border between Bungo Country and Hyūga Country, has had an upper shrine on the summit and eight lower shrines at the foot of the mountain since the middle of the 7th century, according to Kojiki, Nihon Shoki, Emperor Jimmu's grandmother, Toyotama-hime, who appears in the Yamayokohiko and Umiyokohiko myths, is also said to be of the Okami lineage.

The Birth of Shugendo 
It is worth mentioning that in Japan, mountain worship was combined with belief in ancient Shinto and Buddhism (especially esoteric Buddhism such as Tendai-shu and Shingon-shu) to create a unique religion called "Shugendo". Shugendo is the practice of giving people the spiritual power of the mountains absorbed through ascetic practices, and is said to have been founded by Yaku Shokaku. Even today, ascetic monks (called Yamabushi or Shugenja) of the "Honzan" (Tendai sect) or "Tohzan" (Shingon sect) schools practice traditional Shugendo.

History 
Mountain worship originally evolved from Animism of Nature worship, and took the form of Shinbutsu-shūgō until the end of the Edo period, when Shinbutsu-shūgō was banned by the [[Meiji (era) However, since the Separation of Buddhism and Shinto after the Meiji (era), temples and shrines have been separated, including in the Three Mountains of Dewa, where Shugen of the Shingon esoteric Buddhism type was originally strong, and many of the main bodies of faith have taken the form of shrines. Many of the main body of beliefs survived in the form of shrines.

While the mountains were the object of worship as the divine realm, they also developed as the other realm where the spirits of the dead gathered, and where offerings to ancestral spirits such as Itako's Kuchiyose were made. In addition, it is customary for people to climb mountains as a manifestation of their faith, and even today, many people climb mountains, including those that are considered sacred sites.

Mountain worship in China 
In China, Tai Shan, Heng Shan, Bulk Shan, Hua Shan, and Heng Shan are called the Five Mountains and are regarded as deities. Originally, it is thought to have been a mountain worship that believed in the mountain itself, but it has been transformed into one of the gods of Taoism through its association with Bango, myth and Five Elements. However, Mount Tai is still exceptional, not only as a holy place of Taoism, but also as a place of mountain worship with various forms of worship, such as the Tai Temple and Shigantou.

Modern impact of mountaineering and tourism 
Mountaineering has become easier with the development of transportation and the availability of tools and equipment, and people from all walks of life have entered the mountains as sports, competitions, and tourisms. Faith, acts that pollute the natural environment such as leaving trash behind, and climbing accidents due to overconfidence can hurt the feelings of the residents of areas that respect mountain faith, such as Mount Everest and Uluru.

In some cases, local residents believe that they will be punished if they violate these religious prohibitions and hold large-scale festivals to appease the mountain, which further imposes a psychological as well as economic burden on local residents.

See also 
Lords of the Three Mountains: Taoist Deities representing three mountains in Southern China.
Sansin, Korean mountain deities
Sacred mountains

References 

 Taro Wakamori, A Study of the History of Shugendo, Heibonsha [Toyo Bunko], 1972. . Kawade Shobo, 1943.
 Miyake, Jun, Shugendo: Its History and Practice, Kodansha [Kodansha Academic Library], 2001. .
 Miyake, Jun, Studies in Omine Shugendo, Kosei Shuppansha, 1988.
 Jun Miyake, Shugendo and Japanese Religion, Shunjusha, 1995.
 Jun Miyake (ed.), An Invitation to Mountain Shugen: Spiritual Mountains and the Experience of Asceticism, Shinjin-Oraisha, 2011, .
 Gorai Shigeru, Religion in the Mountains, Awakosha, 1970.
 Akihide Suzuki, Shugendo: A Collection of Historical and Ethnographic Essays, 3 volumes, Hozokan, 2003–2004.
 Kesao Miyamoto, Tengu to Shugenja (Tengu and Shugenja), Jinbunshiin, 1989.
 Yasuaki Togawa, A Study of Dewa Sanzan Shugendo, Kosei Shuppansha, 1973.
 Haruki Kageyama, Shintai-zan (Mt. Shintai), Gakusei-sha (New edition), 2001 (1971) (in Japanese).
 Satoru Nagano, A Historical-Geographical Study of Hidehiko-yama Shugendo, Meishu Shuppan, 1987.
 Masataka Suzuki, Mountains, Gods and People: The World of Mountain Belief and Shugendo, Awakosha, 1991.
 "Mountain Beliefs: Exploring the Roots of Japanese Culture," by Masataka Suzuki, Chuokoron Shinsha [Chuko Shinsho], 2015.
 Masataka Suzuki, "Mountain Beliefs in Japan," Takarajimasya [Bessatsu Takarajima 2373], 2015.
 Akihide Suzuki, Shugendo Historical and Ethnographic Review, 3 volumes, Hozokan, 2003–2004.
 Iwashina Koichiro, "History of Fuji-kō," Meisho Shuppan, 1985.
 "Studies in the History of Mountain Religions," 18 volumes, Meisho Shuppan, 1975–1984.
 "History of Wazuka Town," Vol. 1.

External links 
 
 日本山岳修験学会

Shinto
Mountain faith
Pages with unreviewed translations
Shinto cults